The Ministry of Water and Power , wazarat-e- aabb o barq-e  (abbreviated as MoPW) was a federal ministry in Pakistan.

The ministry was dissolved in August 2017. The water division was merged with newly created Ministry of Water Resources and the power division was moved under Ministry of Energy.

Companies/ Divisions

Water and Power Development Authority

National Transmission And Despatch Company
NTDC is a limited company established in 1998. The main function of company is to purchase electric power from generation companies and then sell to distribution companies.

Federal Flood Commission

The Federal Flood Commission (FFC) is an agency within the Ministry that was created in 1977 in response to severe flooding by the Indus River. The FFC has been charged to execute flood control projects and protect lives and property from the impact of floods. By 2010 the FFC had received Rs 87.8 billion since its inception, and its own documents demonstrate  that numerous projects were initiated, paid for, and seemingly completed. However, after the devastating 2010 Pakistan floods the agency has been severely criticized as apparently very little actual work had been done on the ground and it was accused of ineffectiveness and corruption.

Private Power and Infrastructure Board
The Private Power and Infrastructure Board (PPIB) was created in 1994 to promote  private sector participation in the power sector of Pakistan.  PPIB facilitates investors in establishing private power projects and related infrastructure, executes Implementation Agreement (IA) with Project Sponsors and issues sovereign guarantees on behalf of government.

Alternative Energy Development Board

See also

 List of power stations in Pakistan
 List of electric supply companies in Pakistan
 Electricity sector in Pakistan
 Energy policy of Pakistan
 Water resources management in Pakistan
 Energy Department (Punjab, Pakistan)

References

 وزارت پانی و بجلی کے ’غافل‘ حکام پر وزیراعظم برہم (Urdu translation of Ministry of Water and Power)

External links 
 Ministry of Energy (Power Division), Government of Pakistan official website
 Private Power and Infrastructure Board
 Federal Flood Commission
 National Transmission And Despatch Company
 Alternative Energy Development Board

 

Energy in Pakistan
Pakistan
Pakistan
Water in Pakistan
Former government ministries of Pakistan